Suzanne T. Staggs (born May 11, 1965) is an American physicist who is currently the Henry DeWolf Smyth Professor of Physics at Princeton University. Staggs has led the development of numerous cosmic microwave background experiments and is currently the principal investigator (PI) of the Atacama Cosmology Telescope (ACT) and founding member of the Simons Observatory (SO). In 2020, Staggs was elected into the National Academy of Sciences.

Education and career 
Staggs received her B.A. in physics from Rice University in 1987 and her Ph.D. in physics from Princeton University in 1993. She was a postdoctoral researcher at the University of Chicago for 3 years before joining the faculty at Princeton in 1996. Staggs was elected as a member of the American Academy of Arts and Sciences in 2017 and a member of the National Academy of Sciences in 2020.

Research 
Staggs's research is in cosmology, through observations of the cosmic microwave background (CMB). She has been involved in or led various CMB experiments since 1989 including XPER, PIQUE, CAPMAP, QUIET, ABS, ACT, and SO.

Awards 
 2017 – Fellow of the American Academy of Arts and Sciences
 2004 – Maria Goeppert Mayer Award from the American Physical Society
 2000 - National Science Foundation Career Award
 1998 – Alfred P. Sloan Research Fellowship
 1994 – NASA Hubble Fellowship
 1994 – Enrico Fermi Fellowship at the University of Chicago

See also
List of women in leadership positions on astronomical instrumentation projects

References

Living people
Princeton University faculty
21st-century American physicists
Rice University alumni
Princeton University alumni
1965 births